Sam McMahon (born 1967) is a female Australian senator for the Northern Territory elected in 2019.

Sam McMahon may also refer to:

Sam McMahon (footballer) (born 1976), male English former footballer